Strozzi chapel may refer to:

Cappella Strozzi di Mantova, Santa Maria Novella, Florence
Filippo Strozzi Chapel, Santa Maria Novella, Florence